The 2019–20 Oregon Ducks women's basketball team represented the University of Oregon during the 2019–20 NCAA Division I women's basketball season. The Ducks, led by sixth-year head coach Kelly Graves, played home games at the Matthew Knight Arena as members of the Pac-12 Conference.

Offseason

Departures

Incoming transfers

Recruiting class of 2019

 ESPN did not include Cochrane in its list of 2019 Oregon recruits.

Recruiting class of 2020

Roster

Schedule

|-
!colspan=9 style=| Exhibition

|-
!colspan=9 style=| Regular season

|-
!colspan=9 style=|Pac-12 Women's Tournament

|-
!colspan=9 style=|NCAA Women's Tournament
|-
| colspan=9 align=center | Not held due to the COVID-19 pandemic

Rankings

^Coaches did not release a Week 2 poll.

See also
 2019–20 Oregon Ducks men's basketball team

References

Oregon Ducks women's basketball seasons
Oregon
Oregon Ducks
Oregon Ducks